Magomedgasan Mingazhutdinovich Abushev (born 10 November 1959) is a Kumyk retired featherweight freestyle wrestler from Dagestan. Competing for the Soviet Union he won gold medals at the 1980 Olympics and 1980 European Championships.

Abushev took up wrestling in 1971, and won world junior titles in 1977 (flyweight) and 1979 (featherweight). He won his only Soviet title in 1984 as a lightweight. Earlier in 1981 he graduated in economics from the Dagestan State University and after retiring from wrestling became a businessman in Dagestan. From 1994 to 1998 he worked at the Derbent Oil Depot, and in 1998–2003 was the deputy head of the cognac-producing company Dagvino. In 2003 he became an auditor of the Accounts Chamber of Dagestan.

References

1959 births
Living people
People from Karabudakhkentsky District
Sportspeople from Dagestan
Kumyks
Soviet male sport wrestlers
Olympic wrestlers of the Soviet Union
Wrestlers at the 1980 Summer Olympics
Russian male sport wrestlers
Olympic gold medalists for the Soviet Union
Olympic medalists in wrestling
Medalists at the 1980 Summer Olympics
European Wrestling Champions